Nishiwaki can refer to:

 Nishiwaki, Hyōgo, Japan
 Nishiwakishi Station
 Junzaburō Nishiwaki (1894–1982), Japanese writer
 Michiko Nishiwaki (born 1957), Japanese actress
 Takatoshi Nishiwaki (born 1955), governor of Kyoto Prefecture, Japan